The 2013 season was Sogndal's third season back in the Tippeligaen. They finished the season in 12th place and were knocked out of the cup by Vålerenga in the Fourth Round.

Squad

On Loan

Transfers

Winter

In:
 

Out:

Summer

In:

Out:

Competitions

Tippeligaen

Results summary

Matches

Table

Norwegian Cup

Squad statistics

Appearances and goals

|-
|colspan="14"|Players away from Sogndal on loan:

|-
|colspan="14"|Players who left Sogndal during the season:

|}

Goal scorers

Disciplinary record

Notes

References

Sogndal Fotball seasons
Sogndal